Borg is a common surname in the Nordic countries as well as in Malta. Borg may refer to:

 Åke Borg (1901–1973), Swedish swimmer, twin brother of Arne
 Alex Borg (born 1969), Maltese snooker player
 Anders Borg (born 1968), Swedish politician
 Andy Borg (born 1960), Austrian singer
 Anita Borg (1949–2003), American historical computer scientist
 Anna Borg (1903–1963), Danish-Icelandic actress
 Arne Borg (1901–1987), Swedish swimmer, twin brother of Åke
 Barbara Borg (born 1960), German Professor of Classical Archaeology at University of Exeter
 Björn Borg (born 1956), Swedish tennis player
 Björn Borg (swimmer) (1919–2009), Swedish swimmer
 Brita Borg (1926–2010), Swedish singer and actress
 Carl Oscar Borg (1879–1947), Swedish-American painter
 Carmelo Borg Pisani (1914–1942), Maltese political activist and spy
 Charmaine Borg (born 1990), Canadian politician
 Christabelle Borg (born 1992), Maltese singer
 Coryse Borg, Maltese actress and director
 Dorothy Borg, American historian of United States – East Asian relations
 David Borg, Canadian film producer
Devon Borg, American scholar
Dominic Borg (17th century), a minor Maltese philosopher
 Elsa Borg (1826–1909), Swedish social worker
 Flula Borg (born 1982), German YouTube personality, DJ and actor
 Freddy Borg (born 1983), Swedish football striker, currently with Alemannia Aachen
 George Borg (judge) (1887-1954), Maltese judge and politician
 George M. Borg (1934-1971), American politician
 Gerard James Borg, Maltese songwriter
 Giorgio Borġ Olivier (1911–1980), Maltese politician, twice Prime Minister
 Hasse Borg (born 1953), Swedish footballer
 Jákup á Borg (born 1979), Faroese footballer
 Joe Borg (born 1952), Maltese politician
 Joseph Borg (regulator) (born 1951), American financial regulator
 Katarina Borg (born 1964), Swedish orienteering competitor
 Kevin Borg (born 1986), Maltese singer
 Kim Borg (1919–2000), Finnish opera singer
 Lorraine Borg (1923–2006), All-American Girls Professional Baseball League player
 Marcus Borg (1942–2015), American theologian  
 Nicke Borg (born 1973), Swedish singer and guitarist
 O.J. Borg (born 1979), Maltese-British radio and television personality
 Oscar Borg (1851–1930), Norwegian composer
 Parker W. Borg (born 1939), American diplomat and professor
 Paul Borg Olivier (born 1969), Maltese politician, grandnephew of Giorgio Borġ Olivier
 Peter Paul Borg (1843–1934), Maltese theologian, canonist and minor philosopher.
 Ray Borg (born 1993), American mixed martial artist
 Reginald Le Borg (1902–1989), Austrian filmmaker
 Richard Borg, American game designer
 Tahlia Borg (born 2002), Australian vocalist, drummer and member of Adelaide indie rock band Teenage Joans
 Tonio Borg (born 1957), Maltese politician
 Veda Ann Borg (1915–1973), American film actress
 Vincenzo Borg (1777–1837), Maltese merchant and rebel leader
 Walter Borg (1870–1918), Swedish-Finn communist
 Wes Borg, Canadian comedian and musician

Surnames
Swedish-language surnames
Maltese-language surnames